Historic Toronto fire stations are primarily in the downtown core and with the former Toronto Fire Department.

Fire stations built from the late 19th century and up to 1950s varied in style. Fire halls built from the 1950s to 1980s tended to be utilitarian in design and found in the suburbs (North York, Scarborough and Etobicoke). The latest fire stations are modern, but they often lack the character of older fire stations in the city.

Most fire halls built after the 1940s are demolished when they are retired and rarely re-used.

A list of designs of historic fire stations in the city

Amsterdam 

 Station 227
 Built: 1905 as Toronto Fire Department (TFD) 17 
 Also known as "Kew Beach Fire Hall"
 Location: 1904 Queen Street East, The Beach
 Main structure: Three-storey main Queen Anne structure with a clock tower and a single vehicle bay.
 A tower is on the side of this structure.
 Additional structures: An additional bay which was added later (1960).
 Station 226
 Built: 1910-11 as TFD 22
 Location: 87 Main Street, Upper Beaches
 Main Structure: A two-storey main structure houses two vehicle bays. A tower is located at the rear of the building.
 Additional Structure: Two-storey Romanesque Revival with a bay window structure. Original Station 2 (storey wood fire hall with tower) next door was demolished after 1911

 Station 311
 Balmoral Fire Hall National Historic Site
 Built: 1911 as TFD 24
 Location: 20 Balmoral Avenue, Deer Park
 Main Structure: A three-storey Romanesque Revival main structure with two bays
 Nickname: 311: Knights of Balmoral
 

Located just off Yonge Street, south of St. Clair Avenue, Balmoral Fire Hall was built in an era when horses pulled hose wagons through its double doors. Still visible along the east wall is a second-storey projecting beam and doorway where hay was hoisted into a loft for feed. In the rear, a tower capable of drying 50-foot hoses still stands. The building was designated a National Historic Site of Canada in 1990, for its rare adoption of the Queen Anne style.

 Station 343
 Built: 1916 as TFD 25
 Location: 65 Hendrick Avenue, Wychwood
 Main Structure: A three-storey main structure with two bays. Tower located in the rear.
 Station 344
 Built: 1910 as TFD 23
 Location: 240 Howland Avenue, Davenport
 Main Structure: A three-storey main structure with two bays, similar to Station 226.
 Additional Structure: Two-storey Victorian bay window structure.

Colonial revival 

 Station 423
 Built: 1959 as TFD 20 - Replacing previous hall on same site built in 1890 (WTJ Fire Hall No. 1)
 Location: 358 Keele Street
 Nickname: West Toronto - The Junction
 Station 325
 Built: 1954 as TFD 7
 Location: 475 Dundas Street East
 Main Structure: A long two-storey main structure with three bays.
 Nickname: Fort Apache

Residential 

 Station 342
 Built: 1912 as TFD 27
 Location: 106 Ascot Avenue
 Main Structure: A two-storey station with one small bay. Old Station 27 next door (1913) now semi-detach home
 Nickname: Mid-Town Mob
 Station 424
 Built: 1927 as TFD 31
 Location: 462 Runnymede Road
 Main Structure: Two-storey building which looks like a house-conversion with two bays. Built from the plans of an existing station located in Florida, the hall opened in July 1927 but was temporarily shut down again in October so a heating system could be retrofitted. This was the first fire station in the city designed to house internal combustion engined apparatus, although it was initially equipped with older "hand-me-down" vehicles from busier stations (the current pumper is only the second unused vehicle ever assigned to the station). The station no longer houses an aerial ladder truck (decommissioned in 2001) so the rear of the second bay has been retrofitted with bunker gear storage racks and can no longer accommodate an aerial. Station 131 (formerly TFD 34) was constructed on the same floor-plan starting the following year (but with an integral heating system)
 Station 425
 Built: 1930 as Village of Swansea FD
 Annexed to Toronto: 1967 as TFD 16
 Location: 83 DeForest Road
 Main Structure: Like Station 424, it looks like a house conversion. The single-storey building has two bays.
 Station 435
 Built: 1930 as New Toronto FD
 Annexed to Etobicoke: 1967, Etobicoke Fire Department Station 9
 Location: 130 Eighth Street
 Main Structure: This two-storey station was built in three stages with the four bays being the newer portion of the building.
 Nickname: R435: The Lone Wolf

Tudor 

 Station 131
 Built: 1931 as TFD 34
 Location: 3135 Yonge Street
 Main Structure: A two-storey building with 2 bays. Sistership to station 424. Extensively retrofitted in 2003, to accommodate a taller aerial ladder truck, the ceiling of the apparatus bay was raised and all the original wood millwork replaced with modern materials due to current building code regulations.
 Station 134
 Built: 1932 as TFD 28
 Location: 16 Montgomery Avenue
 Main Structure: A two-storey building which looks like the houses beside it.
 Station 346
 Built: 1912 - as TFD 32
 Location: CNE grounds near the Dufferin Gates and currently fully operational year round 
 Main Structure: The two-storey structure has two bays and a five-storey clock tower.
 Additional Structures: It is also home to Toronto EMS and Toronto Police Service stations.
 Designed by: G.W. Gouinlock
 Station is fully staffed and runs as P346
 Station 314
 Built: 1929 - as TFD 3
 Location: 32 Grosvenor Street near Yonge Street

Clock tower 

 Station 312
 Built: 1878 for Yorkville Fire Department, became TFD 10 upon annexation in 1883.
 Location: 34 Yorkville Avenue
 Main Structure: It is one of the city's oldest active fire halls. The two-storey structure has a five-storey clock tower with three bays (additional bay added later).  It has a coat of arms from the old Yorkville Town Hall.  It was restored in 1974.

 Station 315
 Built: 1875 as TFD 8 
 Location: 132 Bellevue Avenue
 Main Structure: Like Station 312, this is one of the city's oldest stations. It is a two-storey structure with an eight-storey clock tower. It has three bays, one from the original building. The current tower partially rebuilt in 1972, after the tower and its clock were set ablaze by an arsonist. The tower's clock was not salvageable, and a replica replaced the original when the tower was rebuilt over the course of 1972 to 1973.

Both Stations 312 and 315 are examples of Victorian Gothic architecture.

Other 

 Station 30
 Built: 1928
 Location: 39 Commissioners Street
 Main Structure: 2 floor brick hall with one bay (bricked off) designed by city architect J. J. Woolnough; used by Toronto Professional Fire Fighters Union as offices and meeting hall and Greater Toronto Multiple Alarm Association as meeting place.
 Station 114
 Built: 1942 as North York Fire Department Station 1
 Location: 12 Canterbury Place / Yonge Street and Empress Avenue
 Main Structure: It is the second building to bear the name Ivan M. Nelson Fire Station. The first was North York Fire Station 1 at 5125 Yonge at Empress Avenue. It is now the site of Empress Walk. The 1942 fire hall is gone, but the hose tower and archway entrance remain.  The colonial revival was built in 1942 by Murray Brown on the site of a former municipal building.  An additional bay was added in 1952.  The station was torn down in 1989, but the hose tower was preserved and the stone entrance incorporated with the rear exit at the mall.
 Station 135
 Built: 1923 as Forest Hill Fire Department Station 1 (Forest Hill was annexed into Toronto in 1967, it was renumbered Station 29)and Forest Hill Police Headquarters. It has now been replaced by a new fire station on the west side of Chaplin Crescent just north of Eglinton Avenue West.
 Location: 641 Eglinton Avenue West
 Main Structure: This semi-detached structure has two bays. In order to accommodate a third entrance for Chaplin station on the Eglinton Crosstown line, fire station 135 was closed and its eastern portion demolished. The western portion has been retained because of its heritage status.

 Station 314
 Built: 1926 as TFD 3
 Location: 12 Grosvenor Street
 Main Structure: The station is also called Pumper 314: Running the Strip. TFD 3 dates back to 1874, the original station is located on Yonge St. and is now a club. It has two bays.

Art Deco 

 Station 324
 Built: 1934 as TFD 12
 Location: 840 Gerrard Street East
 Main Structure: The station is very symmetrical with 3 bays.

Retired fire stations 

 Hose Number 6
 Built: 1847, rebuilt 1872
 Location: 315 Queen Street West at John Street, east of Spadina Avenue
 Main Structure: Like stations 315 and 312, it had a clock tower, but it has since been demolished.
 Fire Hall 9
 Built: 1878, closed 1968
 Location: 16 Ossington Avenue, near Queen Street West
 Main Structure: Initially with clock tower, the clock has been removed, leaving a 'pilgrim hat' roof; home to University Health Network Western Men's Withdrawal Management Centre until 2019, now under renovation.
 Station 13
 Built: 1885, closed 1972
 Location: 1717 Dundas Street West at St. Clarens Avenue
 Main Structure: Demolished and now Dundas/St. Clarens Avenue Parkette
 Lombard Street (Central) Fire Hall
 Built: 1886; closed 1970
 Location: 110 Lombard Street, west of Jarvis Street
 Main Structure: Now home to Complections College of Makeup Art and Design (since 2012); previously Gilda's Club Toronto (1997–2011), and The Second City Toronto (1974–1997)
 Station 19
 Built: 1910, closed 1963
 Location: 386 Perth Avenue, near Dupont Street
 Main Structure: Demolished after 1963; now site of home and renumbered
 Station 14
 Built: 1885, closed 1963
 Location: approximately 754 Ossington Avenue, between Northumberland Street and Bloor Street West
 Main Structure: Similar to Station 315 with clock tower; demolished and now Ossington Station bus platform
 Station 31/33
 Built: 1923
 Location: 84 Cibola Avenue (moved from 11 Cibola in 1960)
 ex-Station 31; retired 1993 and now home to Toronto Island Canoe Club at 101 Cibola

 Fire Hall Number 3
 Built: 1872
 Location: 484 Yonge Street
 Main Structure: Like Hose Number 6, this station also had a clock tower.  The tower remains, but the main structure has since been demolished, being replaced in this instance by a retail building.
 As of July 2018 the retail structures around the clock tower has been demolished leaving the tower exposed. The site is being redeveloped and the tower is to be partly saved and incorporated into the new structure.
 Fire Hall Number 1
 Built: 1841
 Location: 139-141 Bay Street - southeast corner of Bay and Temperance Street
 Two-storey brick structure demolished in 1924 and now site of office tower
 Berkeley Fire Hall Number 4
 Built 1905
 Location: 70 Berkeley Street - southwest corner of Berkeley and Adelaide Street East
 Two-storey brick structure with tower (clock portion removed) built by architect A. Frank Wickson; converted to theatre 1972 and home to Alumnae Theatre.
 Station 15 / Station 18
 Built: 1900
 Location: 220 Cowan Avenue - Cowan and Queen Street West
 Hose 15 was created after Toronto annexed Parkdale in 1889. A temporary station was built just north of the Parkdale hall in 1900 and numbered 18 to house the company while a new station was built. The temporary building was retained until 1935. Station 15 was closed in 1972 when a new station opened at 140 Lansdowne Ave. and is now home to Masarayk-Cowan Community Centre (and located next to Gallery 1313, former Metro Toronto Police station 6 built in 1931).
 North York Fire Hall 1
 Built: 1942
 Location: 5095 Yonge Street at Empress Avenue
 Colonial Revival building demolished to make way for retail-condo complex (Empress Walk) in 1989; tower moved to Princess Park in the rear.
 Scarborough Fire Hall 1
 Built: 1925
 Location: 351 Birchmount Road
 Closed 1998 (station moved to TFS Station 225 at 3600 Danforth Road) and now Scarborough Fire Museum and Historical Building
 Mimico Fire Hall and Police Station
 Built: 1929
 Location: 13 Superior Avenue
 Main Structure: Demolished in 2013 to make way for a nine-storey condominium.
 Islington Volunteer Fire Hall (4990 Dundas St W only) 
 Built: 1931 
 Addition added 4992 Dundas Street West; now private businesses

<Friebe, Marla. A History of the Toronto Fire Services 1874-2002. Toronto: City of Toronto, 2003>

Demolished Stations

 Toronto Fire Department Headquarters (1907) and Alarm Office at 152 Adelaide Street West (1910) were Beaux-Arts structures and demolished in the 1970s.
 Toronto Fire Station 11 at 170 Rose Avenue at Howard Street 1884, demolished after 1964
 Toronto Fire Station 13 1717 Dundas Street West 1885; demolished after 1972

References

External links

 House No 8.
 City of Toronto's Inventory of Heritage Properties

Municipal buildings in Toronto
Historic fire station
Fire stations in Toronto
Fire stations in Canada
Toronto